KAPU-LP (104.7 FM) is a radio station broadcasting a Hawaiian music format.  Licensed to serve Watsonville, California, United States, the station is currently owned by Ohana De Watsonville.  Starting its broadcast in September 2004, KAPU-LP claims to be the only radio station on the U.S. mainland broadcasting a Hawaiian music format 24 hours a day.

References

External links
 

APU-LP
APU-LP
Watsonville, California
Radio stations established in 2004
2004 establishments in California